The Millennium Tower is located on Sheikh Zayed Road in Dubai, United Arab Emirates. The tower rises  and has 60 floors. It was completed in 2006. The Millennium Tower contains 301 three-bedroom and 106 two-bedroom apartments.

See also
List of tallest buildings in Dubai
List of tallest buildings in the United Arab Emirates

External links
 Millennium Tower on CTBUH Skyscraper Center
Emporis.com
SkyscraperPage.com

References

Residential buildings completed in 2006
Residential skyscrapers in Dubai
2006 establishments in the United Arab Emirates